William Frederick Le Poer Trench, 5th Earl of Clancarty, 4th Marquess of Heusden (29 December 1868 – 16 February 1929) was an Irish peer of the House of Lords, a Dutch nobleman, and a deputy lieutenant and justice of the peace of County Galway. He was known for the controversy that ensued after a petition for divorce was argued in 1890, which was based on an affidavit accusing his wife at the time, Belle Bilton, of adultery.

Background 

Richard Le Poer Trench, William Trench's great-grandfather, was granted the hereditary title of Marquess of Heusden for his service as a Dutch diplomat. William's status as the Earl of Clancarty was inherited from the First Earl of Clancarty, who was a prominent member of the Irish House of Commons and later the House of Lords.

William inherited his status as a peer of the House of Lords and as a nobleman of the Dutch nobility from his father, Richard Trench. The Trench lineage on England began with Frederic de la Trenche, a man who emigrated to Northumberland, England from the Spanish Netherlands around 1575. Frederic de la Trenche's grandson, Frederic Trench, emigrated to Ireland from England in 1631.

Early life 
He was born on 29 December 1868, the son of Richard Trench and Adeliza Hervey. He used the courtesy title Viscount Dunlo, and was educated at Eton College before serving as a 2nd lieutenant in the 4th Battalion of the King's Shropshire Light Infantry (Royal Herefordshire Militia).

1889–1891 and the cause célèbre 
Dunlo married in 1889, and succeeded his father as the 5th Earl of Clancarty in 1891. The period between those events saw his father, who strongly objected to the marriage, try to undermine it, and place as much as possible of the family estate beyond Dunlo as heir. His initial step was to order Dunlo, who was still under the age of majority of 21, to travel to Australia. 

A petition for divorce was argued in court in 1890, on behalf of Dunlo, before Sir James Hannen. It was based on an affidavit signed in Australia by Dunlo, who later claimed he had signed it without understanding its implications, and named Isidor(e) Emanuel Wertheimer in alleged adultery with his wife Belle, now Lady Dunlo, in London. It became a cause célèbre. The jury found that no misconduct of Lady Dunlo with Wertheimer had been proved; and she was given a highly-paid role in a burlesque Venus by the impresario Augustus Harris.

Later life 

Trench had also served in the positions of deputy lieutenant and justice of the peace of County Galway. Trench as Earl of Clancarty ran into financial troubles, and in 1904 sold the family property at Ballinasloe, County Galway. 

He went bankrupt in 1910, dying in 1929. He was buried in the Clancarty family vault in Highgate Cemetery.

Family 
 
Trench, then known as Viscount Dunlo, married Belle Bilton on 10 July 1889. She was a well-paid music hall performer with the real name of Isabel Maude Penrice Bilton, daughter of John George Bilton, a sergeant in the Royal Engineers. She died on 31 December 1906.

On 7 October 1908, Trench married Mary Gwatkin Ellis, and they had two boys and a girl.

 Richard Frederick John Donough Le Poer Trench (1891—1971), 6th earl of Clancarty
 Power Francis William Le Poer Trench (1891—1894), twin brother of Richard
 Beryl Franziska Kathleen Bianca Le Poer Trench (1893—1957)
 Roderic Charles Berkeley Le Poer Trench (1895—1937)
 Greville Sydney Rocheforte Le Poer Trench (1902—1975), 7th earl of Clancarty
 William Francis Brinsley Le Poer Trench (1911—1995), 8th earl of Clancarty
 Power Edward Ford Le Poer Trench (1917—1995)
 Sibell Alma Kathleen Le Poer Trench (1918—1974)

Three of the sons became Earls of Clancarty.

In literature 
The story of the early relationship troubles of Lord and Lady Dunlo is the subject of the 2018 novel Becoming Belle by Nuala Ní Chonchúir, writing as Nuala O'Connor.

References 

1868 births
1929 deaths
Burials at Highgate Cemetery
Earls of Clancarty
Marquess of Heusden
Trench family
Dutch nobility